The men's 4 × 400 metres relay event at the 1987 Summer Universiade was held at the Stadion Maksimir in Zagreb on 19 July 1987.

Results

References

Athletics at the 1987 Summer Universiade
1987